Events in the year 1993 in Switzerland.

Incumbents
Federal Council:
Otto Stich 
Jean-Pascal Delamuraz 
Kaspar Villiger
Arnold Koller 
Flavio Cotti 
René Felber then Ruth Dreifuss
Adolf Ogi (President)

Events
Switzerland in the Eurovision Song Contest 1993
 18 August – The 14th-century Kapellbrücke covered wooden truss bridge in Lucerne is largely destroyed by fire.

Births

 Olivier Jäckle
 16 February - Christophe Guedes
 2 March - Dany da Silva
 7 June - Gaëtan Karlen
 10 July - Marco Bürki
 20 July - Debrah Scarlett
29 November - Giulian Pedone

Deaths

20 January - Audrey Hepburn
8 February - Franz Schnyder
13 March - Jean Tamini

References

 
Years of the 20th century in Switzerland
1990s in Switzerland